Teeswater (Dent Field) Aerodrome  is located adjacent to Teeswater, Ontario, Canada.

References

Registered aerodromes in Ontario